Jack Turner (February 12, 1920 Seattle, Washington – September 12, 2004 Renton, Washington) was an American racecar driver. He was nicknamed "Cactus Jack."

Midget car career 

Turner became the first two-time AAA National Midget champion when he won the 1954 and 1955 championships. Turner scored no wins in 1954 despite competing at the entire circuit, and won the championship on consistent high finishes. He won six features in 1955. He also had 14 National USAC wins in his career.

Champ car 
He drove in the AAA and USAC Championship Car series, racing in the 1955-1962 seasons with 35 starts, including the Indianapolis 500 races in 1956-1959 and 1961–1962. He finished in the top ten 35 times, with his best finish in 2nd position in 1956 at Darlington.  He retired from racing after flipping his car during a practice run at Indy in 1963. It was his third flip in three years at the track: first down the main straightaway in 1961, second he broke his pelvis at the head of the frontstretch, and third he crushed a vertebra.

Career award 
He was inducted into the National Midget Auto Racing Hall of Fame in the inaugural 1984 class.

Indy 500 results

World Championship career summary
The Indianapolis 500 was part of the FIA World Championship from 1950 through 1960. Drivers competing at Indy during those years were credited with World Championship points and participation. Jack Turner participated in 4 World Championship races but scored no World Championship points.

References

1920 births
2004 deaths
Indianapolis 500 drivers
Racing drivers from Seattle